Ehsan Moradian is an Iranian football goalkeeper who plays for Foolad in the Persian Gulf Pro League.

Club career
Moradian joined Esteghlal Ahvaz in summer 2015. He made his professional debut for Esteghlal Ahvaz on January 28, 2015 against Malavan where he used as a starter.

Club career statistics

Honours
Foolad
Hazfi Cup: 2020–21

Iranian Super Cup: 2021

References

External links
 Ehsan Moradian at IranLeague.ir

1994 births
Living people
Iranian footballers
Esteghlal Ahvaz players
Association football goalkeepers